BMF (or Black Mafia Family) is an American crime drama television series, which follows the Black Mafia Family, a drug trafficking and money laundering organization. The series premiered on September 26, 2021, on Starz. After the series premiere, the series was renewed for a second season which premiered on January 6, 2023. In January 2023, the series was renewed for a third season.

Plot
BMF is inspired by the true story of two brothers who rose from the decaying streets of southwest Detroit in the late 1980s and gave birth to one of the most influential crime families in the history of America. Demetrius "Big Meech" Flenory's charismatic leadership, Terry "Southwest T" Flenory's business acumen and the fraternal partnership's vision beyond the drug trade and into the world of hip hop would render the brothers iconic on a global level. Their unwavering belief in family loyalty would be the cornerstone of their partnership and the crux of their eventual estrangement. This is a story about love, betrayal, and thug-capitalism in the pursuit of the American dream.

Cast and characters

Main
 Russell Hornsby as Charles Flenory
 Demetrius Flenory Jr. as Demetrius "Meech" Flenory
 Da'Vinchi as Terry "Southwest T" Flenory
 Michole Briana White as Lucille Flenory
 Eric Kofi-Abrefa as Lamar Silas
 Ajiona Alexus as Kato (season 1)
 Myles Truitt as B-Mickie
 Steve Harris as Detective Bryant
 La La Anthony as Markaisha Taylor (recurring season 1; main season 2)
 Kelly Hu as Detective Veronica Jin (season 2)

Recurring
 Laila Pruitt as Nicole Flenory 
 Kash Doll as Monique
 Wood Harris as Pat (season 1)
 Snoop Dogg as Pastor Swift
 Lil Zane as Sockie
 Serayah as Lori Walker
 Markice Moore as Filmel
 Yusef Thomas as Roland
 Sean Michael Gloria as Detective Jonathan Lopez
 Sydney Mitchell as Lawanda
 Tyshown Freeman as Hoop
 Peyton Alex Smith as Boom
 Christine Horn as Mabel Jones (season 2)
 Leslie Jones as Federal Agent Tracy Chambers (season 2)
 Caresha Romeka Brownee as Deanna Washington (season 2)
 Mo'Nique as Goldie (season 2)
 Donnell Rawlings as Alvin (season 2)
 Mike Merrill as Ty Washington (season 2)
 Rayan Lawrence as K-9 (season 2)

Cameo appearances
 Eminem as White Boy Rick
 Jalen Rose as Tariq (season 2)

Episodes

Series overview

Season 1 (2021)

Season 2 (2023)

Production

Development
In July 2019, it was announced Curtis "50 Cent" Jackson had begun developing a television series revolving around Black Mafia Family, which he would executive produce for Starz. In April 2020, Starz greenlit the series. Production companies are slated to consist of Lionsgate Television and G-Unit Films and Television Inc. On September 30, 2021, Starz renewed the series for a second season only 4 days after the series' premiere. The second season is scheduled to premiere on January 6, 2023. On January 18, 2023, Starz renewed the series for a third season.

Casting
In December 2020, Russell Hornsby and Steve Harris joined the cast of the series, with Kash Doll set to star in a recurring capacity. In January 2021, Demetrius Flenory Jr., Da'Vinchi, Michole Briana White, Ajiona Alexus, Eric Kofi-Abrefa and Myles Truitt joined the cast in starring roles. In March 2021, Snoop Dogg, La La Anthony and Serayah joined the cast in recurring capacity. In September 2021, Sean Michael Gloria was cast in a recurring role. In March 2022, La La Anthony had been promoted to series regular while Kelly Hu was cast as a new series regular and Christine Horn and Leslie Jones joined the cast in a recurring role for the second season. In February 2023, 2 Chainz and Ne-Yo were cast in recurring capacities for the third season.

Filming
Principal photography began in January 2021 with filming done in Atlanta and Detroit.

References

External links
 
 

2020s American black television series
2020s American crime drama television series
2021 American television series debuts
English-language television shows
Starz original programming
Television series about families
Television series about organized crime
Television series based on actual events
Television series by G-Unit Films and Television Inc.
Television series by Lionsgate Television
Television series set in the 1980s
Television shows filmed in Atlanta
Television shows filmed in Michigan
Television shows set in Detroit
Works about African-American organized crime